René Marie Joseph Leleu (11 June 1911 – June 1984) was a French sculptor and medallist.

Life

René Leleu was born in Lille on 11 June 1911.
He studied at the École des beaux-arts in Lille from 1927 to 1929.
He was a pupil of Aimé-Gustave Blaise in Lille.
Leleu then studied under Paul Landowski and Marcel Gaumont at the École nationale supérieure des Beaux-Arts in Paris. 
He won the Prix de Rome in 1939.
Due to World War II (1939–45) he was unable to study in Rome, but was given a scholarship by the French Academy to stay at the Villa Paradiso in Nice, and then at Fontainebleau.

After the war Leleu devoted himself almost exclusively to monumental sculpture.
He created the Monument à la Résistance of Bohain in 1946.
He then spent seven years to complete the Minotauromachie, which he showed at the Salon de la Jeune Sculpture in 1957.
He taught sculpture and art history at the École des beaux-arts in Valenciennes from 1950 to 1959.
He was then made a lecturer at the U.P. d'Architecture in Rouen.
René Leleu created one of the bronze sculptures for the Mémorial de la France combattante at Mont Valérien in 1960. 
It depicts a phoenix rising from its ashes, and represents the liberation of Alençon on 12 August 1944, the first step towards Paris and Strasbourg.
He was a founding member of the Salon Comparaisons.
He died in Paris in 1984.

Works
Sculptures by Leleu include:
Alençon, Mémorial de la France combattante, Mont Valérien
Héros mourant, plâster, Palais des beaux-arts de Lille
Combattant, bronze, Palais des beaux-arts de Lille
Le Silence, gilded bronze, Musée national d'art moderne Paris
Minotauromachie, plaster, musée des beaux-arts de Valenciennes.
Le penseur, reconstituted stone, Lycée Branly, La Roche-sur-Yon

Publications

Leleu completed Les métamorphoses de l'art in 1954. It was finally published posthumously through the efforts of Jean-Claude Poinsignon, who had organized an exhibition of Leleu's work in 1987 in the Hôtel de ville of Valenciennes.

References

Sources

1911 births
1984 deaths
Prix de Rome for sculpture
20th-century French sculptors
French male sculptors